Andhra Muslims is a name given to Muslims hailing from Andhra Pradesh, India. Andhra Muslims have different traditions and culture both from the rest of the Muslim world and the wider culture of the area they live in. Andhra Muslims speak a distinct dialect of Urdu, referred to as Dakhini, however, most Andhra Muslims are fluent in Telugu as well. Urdu is the second official language in Kadapa, Kurnool, Anantapur, Nellore, Chittoor and Guntur districts of Andhra Pradesh, where Andhra Muslims are significant in numbers.

Andhra and Hyderabadi Muslims 

While Hyderabad is the capital of the state of Telangana and Andhra Pradesh (1956-2014); however, distinctions can be drawn between the indigenous Muslim culture there and throughout the rest of the state. As the capital of the Muslim Nizam dynasty for four centuries, Hyderabad became a site of cultural exchange between many disparate peoples. In comparison to the Andhra Muslims, the old Hyderabadi elite is said to have had foreign roots, and used Urdu as their mother tongue. This influenced the urban Muslim population there; the Andhra Muslims, on the other hand, have been little influenced by foreign cultures. Barring certain districts in the state of Telangana, they almost universally speak a variant of Dakhini, though many can communicate in Telugu. In addition, most speak standard Urdu to a greater or lesser extent, largely because of the dominance of Urdu in Islamic publications in India.

Religion 
Most of the Andhra Muslims are Sunni, and follow the Hanafi school of Islamic Jurisprudence. There is also a minor Shia population in various districts, including Hyderabad and coastal Andhra Pradesh.

Ahle Tashayyu 

Ahle Tashayyu means "people of Shia." The word 'Shia' means followers and is used in the Quran by God. In earlier times, the name given was Shian-e-Ali but over time Ali was dropped and Shia remained as the sole followers of Ali.

Ahle Tashayyu in Andhra Pradesh 

They are located in Chittoor, Nellore, Kurnool, Krishna, West Godavari, East Godavari and Visakhapatnam districts of Andhra Pradesh State of India. Avalakonda, Kagitalapuru, Banaganapalle, Vijayawada, Alinaqipalem, Machilipatnam, Draksharamam, Mogalikuduru (Jagannapeta), Mamidikuduru (Nagaram), Cheduvada (As -Sayyadwada) and Abid Nagar are the places of inhabitation.

Avalakonda (Chittoor District) 

It consists of Abu Talib Masjid, Masjid e Ali, Masjid e Juma. 1965 AP Legislative Assembly mention that there is a Shia-Mosque in Avalakonda village in Chittoor district which got landed property in Tippa Samudram, Pasumarthi, Agaramcheri and Gudiyattam of North Arcot district, Madras State. These have not yet been published in Andhra Pradesh Gazette. Notification has been sent to the press for publication. The Survey commissioner had only made a note in his report against institution, stating that the inams for the mosque are situated in Vellore and Gudiyattum Taluqs of North Arcot district.

Kagitalapuru (Nellore District) 

Kagitalapuru has the Shia Azadari Palace and Ashurkhana e Hussaini.

Banaganapalle (Kurnool District) 

It has Bara Imam Ashurkhana and Imam Hasan Hussain Ashurkhana.

A Manual of the Kistna District, in the Presidency of Madras, compiled in 1883, mentions Muhammad Beg Khan alias Faiz Ali Khan, elder son of Ali Quli Khan son of Faiz Khan Najm-i-Sani son of Baqir Khan Najmai Sani son of Amir Yawar Ahmad Najmai Sani, was granted jagir of Banaganapalle, which is still held by his descendants. Amir Yawar Ahmad Najmai Sani was the commander-in-chief of Armies of Shah Ismail Safavi a(1487-1524), Emperor of Persia. Ala Quli Khan was the Vazir of Aurangzeb.

Vijayawada (NTR District) 

It has Masjid e Hussaini

Alinaqipalem (Krishna District) 

It has Masjid e Shohadai Karbala, Karbala e Mualla and Dargah e Imam Hussain. The ruler of Golconda, Abul Hasan Tanisha, invited Mullah Mohammed Ali from Isfahan in Iran to come to India to teach his Children. Eldest son of Mullah, Haider Ali Naqi Isfahani and two families settled here. Other families joined and a small hub of Shia community gradually emerged. The village derives its name from the first settler and is called Alinaqipalem or Ali Naqi's Village.

Machilipatnam (Krishna District) 

It has following Ashurkhana's : Bara Imam, Ali, Hyder e Karrar, Imam Hussain, Husainiya, Zainulabedin, Abbas, Abu Fazalil Abbas, Bibi Zainab, Bibi Sakina etc.,

A Manual of the Kistna District, in the Presidency of Madras, compiled in the year 1883, mentions Nizamud Daula son of Intizamud Daula son of Rustum Jah alais Subhan Baksh son of Hasan Ali Khan son of Muhammad Taqi Khan son of Yusuf Khan younger son of Ala Quli Khan elder son of Faiz Khan Najmai Sani son of Baqir Khan Najmai Sani son of Amir Yawar Ahmad Najmai Sani, was the nawab of Machilipatnam or Masulipatnam.

Godavari District 

A Manual of the Kistna District, in the Presidency of Madras, compiled in the year 1883, mentions Muhammad Taqi Khan son of Yusuf Khan younger son of Ala Quli Khan elder son of Faiz Khan Najmai Sani son of Baqir Khan Najmai Sani son of Amir Yawar Ahmad Najmai Sani obtained a jagir in Godavari district from Nizam of Hyderabad which he holds to this day.

Mogalikuduru (East Godavari District) 

It has Masjid e Alavi Ishna Ashari

Mamidikuduru (East Godavari District) 

It has Mamidikuduru Nasrulillah Masjid.

Draksharamam (East Godavari District) 

It has Al Jaffery Mosque.

Cheduwada (East Godavari District) 

It has Bargah e Panjatan e Pak Ashurkhana.

Abid Nagar (Vishakhapatnam District) 

It has Idara e Raza.

Language 
Dakhni is the language spoken by Andhra Muslims. The term South Dakhni is not cognizant to Andhra Muslims as they simply refer to it as Urdu, though different from standard Urdu. South Dakhni is closely related to the more widespread Hyderabadi Urdu and are mutually intelligible. South Dakhni has some loan words from Telugu but its contribution to the latter is quite significant. Though they might not be pronounced the same way as in Urdu or South Dakhni that is spoken locally, such words in Telugu were borrowed from Urdu.

Dakhni like Hyderabadi Urdu and other Dakhni dialects is different from traditional Urdu in many ways. The plural of a word is formed by suffixing 'an' to the word (a behaviour having its origins in Awadh region of Uttar Pradesh), the letter 'n' is silent. E.g.  (girls),  (thieves),  (mosquitoes),  (names),  (books). And, the letter "Qaaf" is pronounced as "Khaa"; 'qabar' (grave) is pronounced as 'khabar' (news) and 'qadam' (foot) is pronounced as 'khadam'.

Some Telugu words or phrases in South Dakhni 

Tippalaan meaning Hardship; originally .
Chambu meaning mug, also often used to express exhaustion.
Padjaatha ray thoo (used by Guntur and Nellore Muslims) meaning "you will fall down". However, in North Deccani and other parts of Andhra, it is said as "".

Some Urdu words in Telugu 

Maaji - originally Maazi, meaning former
Tareekhu - originally Tareekh, meaning date (Arabic origin)
Moju - originally Mouj, meaning to have fun
Raaji Naama - originally Raazi Naama, meaning resignation (Persian origin)
Jamindaar - originally Zamindaar, meaning land lord
Jebu - originally Jeb, meaning pocket
Kalamu - originally Qalam, meaning pen (Arabic)
Khaidi - originally Qaidi, meaning inmate (Arabic)
Jawabu - originally Jawab, meaning answer (Arabic)
Sawalu - originally Sawal, meaning question (Arabic)
Tarafu - originally Taraf, meaning direction or on behalf (Arabic)
Meku - originally Mekh, meaning nail (Persian)
Kaazhi (Kaali) - originally Khaali, meaning empty (Arabic)
Kaifiyatu - Originally Kaifiat, meaning state (status) (Arabic)
Mulakatu (Milakat) - Originally Mulaaqaat, meaning Meeting (Arabic)
Goodu Phutani - Originally Goood (Jaggaery)  (nuts), meaning hanky panky (Hindi & Urdu)
Munasabu - originally Munsif, meaning judge (Arabic)
Roju - originally Roz, meaning day (Persian)
Aakhari -originally Aaakhir, meaning last (Arabic)
Kurchi - originally Kursi, meaning chair (Arabic)
Dastavejulu - originally Dastavaiz, meaning documents (Persian)
Darakhastu - originally Darkhwast or Darkhast, meaning request (Persian)
Sifarsu - originally Sifarish, meaning recommend (Persian)
Kaburu - originally Khabar, meaning news (Arabic)
Khitki - originally Khirki, meaning window (Hindi) (Urdu)

Urdu words in Government Administration and Judiciary 

Dastaveju - Originally Dastaaviz, meaning Document.
Dastakatu - Originally Dastakhat, meaning Signature, Handwriting (Arabic)
Dasturi - Originally Dastoori, meaning Handwriting, manuscript (Arabic)
Khajana - Originally Khazana, meaning Treasure or Treasury (Arabic)
Ameena - Originally Ameen, meaning a person who brings summons of the court (Arabic)
Hakku - Originally Huq, meaning 'right' (Arabic)
Hakeekatu - Originally Haqeeqat, meaning reality, truth (Arabic)
Vakeelu - Originally Vakeel, meaning lawyer, advocate

Some salient features of South Dakhni 

Kaiku - why instead of Kyon in traditional Urdu E.g. Kaiku gaya un? (Why did he go?)
Mujhe - me instead of Mereku in Hyderabadi Urdu E.g. Mujhe malum nai. (I don't know.)
Mujhe - E.g. Mujhe une nai poocha (He did not ask me).
Tujhe - you instead of Tereku in Hyderabadi Urdu E.g. Tujhe malum kya? (Do you know?)
Un/In - he/she instead of Woh/Yeh in traditional Urdu E.g. Un kidhar gaya? (Where did he go?)
Ku - for instead of Ko in traditional Urdu E.g. Iqbal ku khana hona kate. (Iqbal wants food.)
Ko - Ke in traditional Urdu E.g. Iqbal ku deko aao. (Iqbal ko deke aao in traditional Urdu meaning Give it to Iqbal and come back here.)
Po - on instead of Pe or Per in traditional Urdu E.g. Kitab table po hai. (The book is on the table.)
Nakko - an alternate (and informal) negative generally indicating "no thanks" or "do not". Can be (and is often) used in place of mat.
Naheen, naa and mat (from traditional Urdu) are still used where nakko is inappropriate for the context or in polite situations. E.g. Khana nakko mujhe. (I don't want food.)
Hau - for yes, instead of "Haan".
Potti - (slang; rather offensive) - Girl
Potta - (slang; rather offensive) - Boy
Khan - Man E.g. Chalo khan. (Let's go, man.)
Hallu/Halka - Slow E.g. Zara hallu/halka chalo bawa. (Will you walk a bit slow?)
Kate - Essentially meaning "It seems/ So". E.g. Kaiku kate? (Why so?); Iqbal ku khana hona kate. (It seems Iqbal wants food.)

History 
The spread of Islam in Andhra Pradesh has been the gradual result of centuries of Muslim rule of Mughals, Qutub Shahi's (Golconda Sultanate) and the Asaf Jahis dynasties. Consequently, there is no specific time period from which the spread of Islam here may be dated.A useful indicator would be the invasion of Malik Kafur in 1312. Proselytization was carried out by individual Sufi saints and major shrines may be found in Kadapa and Penukonda.

Population 
According to the Census of 2001, Andhra Pradesh has a population of approximately 7 million Muslims who form around a little under 9% of the State's population. Out of this around a million and a half live in Hyderabad. Therefore, an approximate figure for Andhra Muslims in Andhra region would be somewhere around 6 million. The sex ratio is around 960 females per 1000 males, higher than the national average of 933. The literacy rate stands at 68%, again higher than the national average of 64%.

Distribution 
Andhra Muslims are found fairly spread over the State. However their greatest concentration is in Kurnool district where they number around 600,000 and form 17% of the district's population. Important populations are also found in Vijayawada, Kadapa, Guntur and Anantapur. Like the Muslims of North India, Andhra Muslims are also concentrated in the cities with much smaller rural populations. Kadapa and Anantapur have around 30% and 25% respectively. North Coastal Andhra has very few Muslims.

In Andhra Pradesh after bifurcation (2014)
After bifurcation, A.P. has 13 districts. Among these 13 districts, four Rayalaseema Districts (Kurnool, Kadapa, Anantapur and Chittoor Districts) and four Coastal Andhra districts (Nellore, Ongole, Guntur and Krishna Districts) have a considerable Muslim population. East Godavari, West Godavari and Visakhapatnam Districts have a small Muslim population.

Occupational structure 
Most Andhra Muslims like rest of Andhra population are agriculturists. Many Andhra Muslims are also found in various crafts, some passed on for generations. Significant number are involved in small businesses and what is known as "Kutir Parishrama". Due to the lack of higher education among Andhra Muslims, their representation among executive level jobs is limited. However, many Andhra Muslims have held distinguished posts in the State and the central administration as also in the private sector.

Notable Andhra Muslims
 Dr.Mohammad Iqbal Chand, Poet, Scholar, IT Generalist
 Waheeda Rehman, Actress
 Dr. Shaik Abdul Rahman, former VUDA Chairman, EX MLA.
 S. M. Laljan Basha, former Vice President of Telugu Desam Party
 Ali (actor)
 Zarina Wahab, Bollywood actress
 Mano (singer)
 Sheik Chinna Moulana, Musician
 Sameer Hasan, Telugu Actor
 Shafi, Telugu actor
 Jani Master, Tollywood Choreographer
 Shakeela, Actress
 Khayyum, Telugu actor
 Vempalli Shariff, Telugu Writer 
 Jaffar Babu, Telugu Journalist
 Shaik Nazar, Burrakatha Pithamahudu

See also
 Bangalori Urdu
 Dakhni
 Hyderabadi Urdu

References

Islam in India by location
Muslim communities of India
Telugu society
Social groups of Andhra Pradesh